Bank of Credit and Commerce International S.A. v. Aboody [1992] 4 All ER 955 is an English contract law case relating to undue influence.

Facts
Mrs. Aboody signed a document making a charge over the family home in favour of Bank of Credit and Commerce International, to secure her husband’s borrowing for his company. Mr. Aboody had bullied her, and she had signed to get some peace.

Judgment
Slade LJ held that because of  "manifest disadvantage" had to be shown even in cases of actual undue influence.

See also

English contract law
Undue influence in English law
Iniquitous pressure in English law
Lloyds Bank Ltd v Bundy [1975] QB 326
Williams v. Walker-Thomas Furniture Co. 350 F.2d 445 (C.A. D.C. 1965)

English unconscionability case law
1992 in case law
1992 in British law